Harry Watkins (January 14, 1825 – February 5, 1894) was an American actor, theatre manager and playwright, whose career spanned the latter half of the nineteenth century.  He is best remembered for his diary, kept from 1845 to 1860, which is considered a rare source of firsthand information about theater in the U.S. during the antebellum period.

Life and career
Watkins was born in New York.  He began his acting career in 1845 and, although he was constantly employed as an actor for nearly five decades, he never achieved widespread fame.  On February 5, 1854, Watkins married Harriet M. Secor with whom he had two children. It is not yet known what became of Harriet and their children, but in 1860, Watkins married English-born actress and singer Rosina Shaw (widow of Charles Howard), who used the stage names Rose Howard and Rose Shaw. Watkins became manager of P. T. Barnum's American Museum's theatrical enterprises in 1857, where he wrote, presented, and acted in, among other things, The Pioneer Patriot. He and his wife, Rose, performed in England from 1860 to 1863. He was described by the British press as "decidedly one of the best delineators of Negro character", but in general his wife had more success in England.

Watkins played such roles as Edward Middleton in The Drunkard, Wool in his own adaptation of The Hidden Hand, and Titus in Brutus by John Howard Payne.  He was the author of more than 25 plays by 1889. He was also actively engaged in politics, often expressing his views in his diary as well as in bulletins, such as How Shall I Vote? (1885), and in his book His Worst Enemy: Photographed from Life In New York (1889).

Diary
Watkins' diary, which he kept during the first fifteen years of his acting career (November 20, 1845 – 1860), is a rare source of firsthand information about the theater during the antebellum period. It "is the only known diary of its size and scope written by an American actor during the decade prior to the Civil War".

Although Watkins' daughter, Amy Lee, had intended to use his diary as support to write a book about him, she exchanged it with Maud Durbin Skinner (the wife of Otis Skinner), probably due to financial hardship, for the amount of her dentist bill and a small compensation. The complete thirteen volumes of the original manuscript of the diaries are held as part of the Skinner Family papers at Houghton Library, Harvard University, which has digitized and made them available online. In 2012, a group of scholars began a digital project to transcribe and publish the diaries. The project, A Player and a Gentleman: The Diary of Harry Watkins, Nineteenth-Century American Actor, aims to shed new light on pre-Civil War theatre culture and the experiences and conditions of artists during that period.

Personal
Watkins and his first wife Harriet had two sons, George Washington Watkins (named after Harry's brother) and Harry Clay Watkins. With his second wife Rose, Watkins had two more children, William S. Watkins and Amy Lee Watkins. The children, as well as Watkins's stepson (Charles Howard Watkins), became actors.  Charles and William both died in 1887, the former of consumption, and two weeks later the latter from a grape seed lodged in his appendix, which caused an inflammation and abscess, leading to a perforation of the intestine. Charles was 29, and William was 19.

In popular culture
Watkins is fictionalized in the Martin Scorsese film Gangs of New York, in a scene where The Five Points Mission presents a dramatization of Harriet Beecher Stowe's Uncle Tom's Cabin. Barnum had presented H. J. Conway's popular version of Uncle Tom's Cabin at the American Museum in the 1850s, which varied from the novel especially in ending happily.

Notes

References
Skinner, Maud and Otis. One Man in His Time: The Adventures of H. Watkins, Strolling Player, Philadelphia: University of Pennsylvania Press (1938).
Watkins, Harry. The Diary of Harry Watkins (1860), Skinner Family Papers, Houghton Library, University of Michigan
Hughes, Amy E. and Naomi J. Stubbs. A Player and a Gentleman: The Diary of Harry Watkins, Nineteenth-Century US American Actor, University of Michigan Press (2018)

External links
The Harry Watkins Diary: Digital Edition (searchable uncorrected text, linked to scanned images, from the University of Michigan)
Transcription Project

1825 births
1894 deaths
American male actors
American diarists
19th-century American male actors
19th-century diarists